Mitja Drinovec (born 22 February 1996) is a Slovenian biathlete. He competed in the 2018 Winter Olympics.

References

1996 births
Living people
Biathletes at the 2018 Winter Olympics
Slovenian male biathletes
Olympic biathletes of Slovenia
21st-century Slovenian people